Kelly at Midnight  is an album by jazz pianist Wynton Kelly released on the Vee-Jay label featuring performances by Kelly with Paul Chambers and Philly Joe Jones recorded in 1960.

Reception
The AllMusic review by Ron Wynn states "This 1960 date was a first-rate trio outing with Kelly given the space to demonstrate subtlety and flair, harmonic precision, melodic brilliance and rhythmic diversity".

Track listing
All compositions by Wynton Kelly except as indicated
 "Temperance" – 7:31  
 "Weird Lullaby" (Babs Gonzales) – 7:11  
 "On Stage" (Rudy Stevenson) – 5:13  
 "Skatin'" (Stevenson) – 5:48  
 "Pot Luck" – 6:48
Recorded at Bell Sound Studios in New York City on April 27, 1960

Personnel
Wynton Kelly – piano
Paul Chambers – bass
Philly Joe Jones – drums
Nat Hentoff – liner notes

References

1960 albums
Vee-Jay Records albums
Wynton Kelly albums
Instrumental albums